2020 Iowa caucuses may refer to:

 2020 Iowa Democratic caucuses
 2020 Iowa Republican caucuses